Henryk Fronczak (16 August 1898 – 4 April 1981) was a Polish rower. He competed in the men's coxed four event at the 1924 Summer Olympics.

References

External links
 

1898 births
1981 deaths
Polish male rowers
Olympic rowers of Poland
Rowers at the 1924 Summer Olympics
Rowers from Warsaw
People from Warsaw Governorate